Jean VII d'Harcourt (1369-18 December 1452, Châtellerault) was a French nobleman.  He was Count of Harcourt, Count of Aumale, Viscount of Châtellerault, and Seigneur of Mézières, of Elbeuf, of Lillebone, of La Saussaye etc.

He was the son of John VI of Harcourt, Count of Harcourt, and of Catherine de Bourbon, sister-in-law of King Charles V of France.  On 17 March 1390, he married Marie of Alençon (29 March 1373 – 1417), princess of the blood, daughter of Pierre II, Count of Alençon and of Marie Chamaillart d'Anthenaise, Viscountess of Beaumont, and they had three children:
 John VIII of Harcourt , Count of Aumale, lieutenant and captain general of Normandy, killed at the Battle of Verneuil.
 Marie of Harcourt (1398–1476), wife of Antoine of Lorraine, Count of Vaudémont, who is the origin of the Harcourt-Lorraine branch.
 Jeanne of Harcourt (1399–1456)

He participated in the siege of Taillebourg, where he was made a knight by his uncle Louis II, Duke of Bourbon, and at the siege of Tunis and Harfleur.  He distinguished himself at the Battle of Agincourt (1415), where he was taken prisoner.

In 1418, his castle at Harcourt was taken by the English.  His titles of Count of Aumale and Count of Harcourt were usurped and given to Richard de Beauchamp, 13th Earl of Warwick and Thomas Beaufort, Duke of Exeter.

His cousin, King Charles VI, therefore supported him and named him captain general of Normandy, and gave him a gift of 1000 books.  On his death in 1452, he was buried at the Franciscan convent at Châtellerault, which he had founded. With him, the oldest branch of Harcourt became extinct.

References

  Gilles-André de La Roque, Histoire généalogique de la maison de Harcourt, 1662
  Dom Lenoir, Preuves généalogiques et historiques de la Maison d'Harcourt, 1907
  Georges Martin, Histoire et Généalogie de la Maison d'Harcourt, 1994
  Dictionnaire de biographie française, 1989

Counts of Aumale
People of the Hundred Years' War
House of Harcourt
1369 births
1452 deaths